The 1997 Royal Bank Cup was the 27th Junior "A" 1997 ice hockey national championship for the Canadian Junior A Hockey League.

The Royal Bank Cup was competed for by the winners of the Doyle Cup, the Anavet Cup, the Dudley Hewitt Cup, the Fred Page Cup and a host city.

The tournament was hosted by the Summerside Western Capitals and Summerside, Prince Edward Island.

The Playoffs

Round Robin

Results
Weyburn Red Wings defeat Kanata Valley Lasers 7-3
Summerside Western Capitals defeat Rayside-Balfour Sabrecats 5-1
South Surrey Eagles defeat Rayside-Balfour Sabrecats 5-2
Kanata Valley Lasers defeat Summerside Western Capitals 7-5
Weyburn Red Wings defeat Summerside Western Capitals 8-2
Kanata Valley Lasers defeat Rayside-Balfour Sabrecats 5-4
South Surrey Eagles defeat Weyburn Red Wings 5-4 in Overtime for the Abbott Cup
South Surrey Eagles defeat Summerside Western Capitals 3-2 in Overtime
Weyburn Red Wings defeat Rayside-Balfour Sabrecats 7-0
Kanata Valley Lasers defeat South Surrey Eagles 7-6

Semi-finals and Final

Note: Summerside defeated Weyburn in Overtime.

Awards
Most Valuable Player: Mark Hartigan (Weyburn Red Wings)
Top Scorer: Mark Hartigan (Weyburn Red Wings)
Most Sportsmanlike Player: Ryan Jardine (Kanata Valley Lasers)
Top Goalie: Geoff Derouin (Weyburn Red Wings)
Top Forward: Scott Gomez (South Surrey Eagles)
Top Defenceman: Jakub Ficenec (South Surrey Eagles)

Roll of League Champions
AJHL: Fort McMurray Oil Barons
BCHL: South Surrey Eagles
CJHL: Kanata Valley Lasers
MJHL: St. James Canadians
MJAHL: Summerside Western Capitals
NOJHL: Rayside-Balfour Sabrecats
OPJHL: Milton Merchants
QPJHL: Longueuil Collège Français
RMJHL: Cranbrook Colts
SJHL: Weyburn Red Wings

See also
Canadian Junior A Hockey League
Royal Bank Cup
Anavet Cup
Doyle Cup
Dudley Hewitt Cup
Fred Page Cup
Abbott Cup
Mowat Cup

External links
Royal Bank Cup Website

1997
Sport in Summerside, Prince Edward Island
Cup
Ice hockey competitions in Prince Edward Island
1997 in Prince Edward Island